Victor Hugo (1802–1885) was a French poet, novelist, and dramatist of the Romantic, author of Les Misérables.

Victor Hugo may also refer to:

People
 Victor Hugo (artist and window dresser) (1942-1993), Venezuelan artist, window dresser and model
 Victor Hugo (Australian footballer) (born 1953), Australian rules footballer
 Victor Hugo (footballer, born 1991) (born 1991), Brazilian association footballer
 Victor Hugo (footballer, born 2004) (born 2004), Brazilian association footballer
 Victor Hugo (Cars), a character in the film Cars 2

Other uses
 Victor Hugo (Paris Métro), a station on Paris Métro Line 2
 French cruiser Victor Hugo, in service with the French Navy 1907–30

Similar spellings
 Vítor Hugo (disambiguation)

See also
 
 

Hugo, Victor